The Mysuru–Talaguppa Express is an Express train belonging to South Western Railway zone that runs between  and  in India. It is currently being operated with 16227/16228 train numbers on a daily basis.

Service

The 16227/Mysuru- Talaguppa Express has average speed of 44 km/hr and covers 509 km in 11h 30m. The 16228/Talaguppa Mysuru Express has average speed of 45 km/hr and covers 509 km in 11h 25m.

Route and halts 

The important halts of the train are:

Coach composition

The train has standard ICF rakes with a max speed of 110 kmph. The train consists of 22 coaches:

 1 First AC
 2 AC III Tier
 10 Sleeper coaches
 5 General Unreserved
 2 Seating cum Luggage Rake

Traction

Both trains are hauled by a Krishnarajapuram Loco Shed-based WDP-4 diesel locomotive from Mysore to Talaguppa and vice versa.

Rake sharing

The train shares its rake with 16219/16220 Chamarajanagar–Tirupati Express and 56206/56205 Nanjangud–Mysuru Passenger.

See also 

 Mysore Junction railway station
 Talaguppa railway station
 Chamarajanagar–Tirupati Fast Passenger
 Nanjangud–Mysuru Passenger

Notes

References

External links 

 16227/Mysuru–Talguppa (via Bangalore) Express India Rail Info
 16228/Talguppa–Mysuru (via Bangalore) Express India Rail Info

Transport in Mysore
Express trains in India
Rail transport in Karnataka
Railway services introduced in 2017